World Youth Day 2000 was a Catholic youth festival held from 15–20 August 2000 in Rome, Italy.

Pope's message to the event
"After having crossed the continents, this Cross now returns to Rome bringing with it the prayer and commitment of millions of young people who in it have recognized the simple and sacred sign of God's love for humanity. As you know, precisely Rome will host the World Youth Day of the year 2000, in the heart of the Great Jubilee."

Message of John Paul II for WYD 2000, June 29, 1999

Theme
"The word was made flesh, and dwelt amongst us" (John 1:14)
Pope John Paul II chose as the motto of this World Youth Day, the lapidary phrase with which the apostle John expresses the mystery of God made man. According to the apostle John: "What distinguishes the Christian faith in all other religions is the certainty that the man Jesus of Nazareth is the Son of God, the Word made flesh, the Second Person of the Trinity entered the world".

Anthem
The Official hymn "Emmanuel", sung in Italian, Spanish, English and French, was composed by Marco Mammoli, Marco Brusati, Mauro Labellarte and Massimo Versaci and arranged by Valter Vincenti. It was performed by Giuseppe Barbera. The English version of the song is featured in the 2001 album "Jamie Rivera: Heal Our Land" released by Philippine recording company Star Music as its final soundtrack where it was sung by Jamie Rivera along with other singers.

Logo

The logo summarizes the three fundamental elements of the World Youth Day: the place, the protagonists and the meeting. The city of Rome is represented by the dome of St. Peter's Basilica and the arms of the Bernini colonnade. The image of the dome recalls the reality of the Church and the pontiff.

The meeting between the Church and the world takes place through an "embrace", which represents the Church that welcomes the young Catholics of Rome.

For the colors, three flat colors of the same gradation werde chosen: yellow, orange and red. Yellow and red are the colors of the city of Rome, while the orange symbolizes the meeting as it is a mix between these two colors.

Events

The international level celebration of World Youth Day in 2000 was meant to coincide with the Jubilee Year proclaimed by Pope John Paul II, to celebrate 2000 years since the birth of Jesus Christ. This is also reflected in the theme for the celebrations.

The program of the Days

The Pope greeted the pilgrims in St. Peter's Square before the WYDs, "Days in the Dioceses" were held, which for the first time included volunteer experiences.

Tuesday 15 August
The fifteenth WYD officially began in the afternoon with the opening mass in Archbasilica of St. John Lateran presided by the Pope reserved for young Romans and Italians. Subsequently, the Pope moved to St. Peter's Square in which there was a celebration of welcome reserved for young foreigners.

Wednesday 16 August
Beginning of the three days of morning catechesis for the participants, held in some churches in Rome and neighboring dioceses divided by linguistic groups held by cardinals and bishops from all over the world.
From this day it was possible for the young participants take the Jubilee Pilgrimage crossing the Holy Door of St. Peter's Basilica.

Thursday 17 August
The program of the previous day was repeated.

Friday 18 August
The program of the previous day was repeated.
In the evening there was a Via Crucis with the cross of the Holy Year presided by Camillo Ruini from the Basilica of Santa Maria in Ara Coeli at the Colosseum.

Saturday 19 August
At noon all the church bells of Rome played at the Angelus prayer party.
The young people went to the Tor Vergata area, reached in the evening by the pope who presided the vigil. John Paul II called the young people "sentinels in the morning" ("sentinelle del mattino") and invited them not to resign themselves to the injustices of the world. The pope asked all participants to defend peace, to make the world more and more habitable and to say their "yes" to Christ as the center of their ideal and realization of happiness.

"If you are what you must be, you will set the whole world ablaze!" (Pope John Paul II)

Sunday 20 August
In the morning the Eucharistic celebration was not held at Saint Peter's Square but in the University of Rome Tor Vergata, followed by the recital of the Angelus prayer. After that, Pope announced that the 2002 WYD would be held in Toronto.

Delegations and public of WYD
157 countries were represented at these world days.

According to the organizers, about two million young people participated, one of the highest registered, but less than five million from the Manila edition.
 
The French delegation is quite important (70,000 people), a logical consequence of the enthusiasm for the World Youth Day 1997 in Paris, including also 12,000 Germans.

In Italy, journalists coined the term "Papaboy" to indicate the young people who attended the meeting. The term soon became commonplace to indicate the participants of all subsequent gatherings with the Pope.

References

External links

 www.vatican.va
 gmg2000.it 

2000 in Italy
2000
2000 in Christianity
Holy See–Italy relations
2000s in Rome
2000 in religion
Pope John Paul II
Catholic Church in Italy
Christianity in Rome
Events in Rome
History of Rome
20th century in Italy
August 2000 events in Europe